Ophelia Marie, also known as Ophelia Olivaccé-Marie (born 28 March 1951), is a popular singer of cadence-lypso from Dominica in the 1980s.  She is sometimes referred to as "Dominica's Lady of Song", the "First Lady of Creole", and "la grande dame de la musique Antillaise".

Ophelia emerged and became Dominica's first Lypo female singer to achieve international star status. She is considered to be the "Godmother of Cadence", and has toured widely in France and had concerts broadcast over much of the Francophone world.
Her signature tune is "Ay Dominique", which was also her first recording, and became an iconic anthem for Dominicans.  Ophelia's musical idol is the South African singer Miriam Makeba

Biography 
Born in Willemstad, Curaçao, Ophelia performed as a young girl in a group called the "Five O's", which performed at church functions.  Her husband and manager, McCarthy Marie, encouraged her to start her solo career.  Her first recording was "Ay Dominique," a "lament for Dominica as the country underwent political problems in the 1970s".  The song became a popular anthem among Dominicans, and she began recording with Gordon Henderson, placing herself at the forefront of cadence-lypso.

She has often sung about women's issues, a rarity at the time, and was among the first women to sing at the Théâtre Noir, Cirque d’Hiver and the Théâtre de la Renaissance. She was the first non-French winner of the Maracas d’Or Award from Société Pernod, and has been awarded International Women's Year in 1985, the Sisserou Award of Honour (the second highest award in Dominica), a Lifetime Award in 2005 and a Golden Drum Award in 1984.  In 2005, Ophelia hosted the fifth Dynamith d'Or Caribbean Music Awards. She has inspired CHS's own Charmed Simplicity "BIG UP".

See also
Music of Dominica

References

External links

1951 births
Living people
People from Willemstad
20th-century Dominica women singers